The Gilder Lehrman Lincoln Prize, founded by the late Richard Gilder and Lewis Lehrman in partnership with Gabor Boritt, Director Emeritus of the Civil War Institute at Gettysburg College, is administered by the Gilder Lehrman Institute for American History. It has been awarded annually since 1991 for "the finest scholarly work in English on Abraham Lincoln, the American Civil War soldier, or the American Civil War era."

Laureates
The prize has been split equally between two entries on six occasions (1992, 2000, 2008, 2009, 2012, and 2014). Recipients of the $50,000 prize have included:

See also
Gilder Lehrman Institute of American History
American Civil War

References

External links
http://www.gilderlehrman.org/
https://www.gilderlehrman.org/programs-and-events/national-book-prizes/gilder-lehrman-lincoln-prize
https://www.gilderlehrman.org/content/national-book-prizes
http://www.gettysburg.edu/lincolnprize/
https://miamioh.edu/cas/academics/departments/history/about/faculty/johnson/index.html
https://yalebooks.yale.edu/book/9780300219753/mourning-lincoln

Historiography of the American Civil War
American history awards
Awards established in 1991
Gettysburg College
1991 establishments in Pennsylvania